Bothrocara brunneum, the twoline eelpout, is a bathydemersal species of fish of the family Zoarcidae. The species is the only fish of the eelpouts to have two lateral lines and short blunt-ended gill rakers. The species has a wide range across the northeastern Pacific Ocean, between the Bering Sea and the shores of San Francisco, and from Attu Island to the Baja California Peninsula.

It has been hypothesized from an analysis of stomach content that the species feeds mainly on bottom-dwelling creatures. Etymologically, Bothrocara stands for "cavity head" and brunneum for "brown", named respectively after the appearance of the head and the tinted brown colour of the body. It was named "twoline eelpout" for its unique two lateral lines.

Description
The twoline eelpout has been found to have two lateral lines, the only one of its family, and also has a small blunt-ended gill raker. Its dorsal and anal fins are covered in a gelatinous tissue. The fecundity is about 215–329 eggs for females measuring  total length.

Feeding habits
It has been hypothesized that, judging by an analysis of stomach content, the species feeds primarily on bottom-dwelling creatures, habitually eating anything it comes across that has food value and that is small enough to ingest.

References

Bibliography

External links

 Bothrocara brunneum at Encyclopedia of Life.
 Bothrocara brunneum at ZipCodeZoo.

Lycodinae
Fish of the Pacific Ocean
Taxa named by Tarleton Hoffman Bean
Fish described in 1890